Aldo Rizzo (24 May 1935 – 9 November 2021) was an Italian politician and magistrate.

Biography
Born in Palermo in 1935, Rizzo was member of the Independent Left. He has served as Mayor of Palermo from August 1992 to December 1992.

He was elected as an independent on the list of the Italian Communist Party first and then the Democratic Party of the Left to the municipal council of Palermo. He left the Democratic Party in March 1992.

He dealt with the kidnapping of the businessman Luciano Cassina in 1974. He was also re-elected in 1983 and 1987 in western Sicily, serving as secretary of the presidential council of the chamber. He was also chosen to serve on the judiciary's Superior Council.

He was regional president in Sicily. He was PM in the trial for the murder of the Palermo prosecutor Pietro Scaglione instructor judge at the Palermo court. He became judge of the Cassation.

Rizzo died on 9 November 2021, at the age of 86.

See also
 List of mayors of Palermo

References

External links
 Aldo Rizzo on storia.camera.it

1935 births
2021 deaths
20th-century Italian politicians
21st-century Italian politicians
Independent Left (Italy) politicians
University of Palermo alumni
Jurists from Palermo
Mayors of Palermo